Outlaw is the fourteenth studio album by American country music artist, Mark Chesnutt. It was released on June 22, 2010, via Saguaro Road Records.

Background
Outlaw, unlike Chesnutt's previous work, is composed of  covers of some 'Outlaw Classics'. The album includes material from Billy Joe Shaver, Willie Nelson, Kris Kristofferson and Waylon Jennings. Chesnutt said  “When I was first approached to record this CD, my reaction wasn’t just ‘yes,’ but ‘hell, yeah. I cut my teeth on this kind of music, and it’s an opportunity [that might not have otherwise presented itself] for me to pay tribute to some of my biggest heroes in country music.” Producer Pete Anderson commended Chesnutt on the work he did with the record by saying “Mark Chesnutt put on a vocal display like I’ve never before seen in the studio. He stood in front of the mic and sang the whole record, from beginning to end, flawlessly [and in less than three hours]. We are all amazed at the results. There may be singers out there as good as Mark, but there are none better and, at this point in my career, I am thrilled to have had the opportunity to work with this caliber of talent.”

Track listing

Personnel
 Pete Anderson - drums, acoustic guitar, bass guitar, electric guitar, harmonica, percussion, slide guitar
 Bob "Boo" Bernstein - pedal steel guitar
 Mark Chesnutt - lead vocals
 Amber Digby - vocals on " A Couple More Years"
 Dennis Gurwell - french accordion
 Gary Morse - pedal steel guitar
 Michael Murphy - keyboards
 Mickey Raphael - harmonica
 Donny Reed - fiddle
 Chris Ross - drums
 Sara Watkins - fiddle, soloist

Chart performance

References

2010 albums
Albums produced by Pete Anderson
Mark Chesnutt albums